U.S. Chaos are an American punk rock band from Paterson, New Jersey, United States, formed in 1981 from remnants of first wave punk outfits The Radicals in 1978 and The Front Line in 1979. They are the first American band to play in an Oi!/street punk style. The band's approach was to play music with lyrics that had an overtly right-wing prose and sense of American patriotism. They often played recordings of military marches and air raid sirens before going on stage.

Career
U.S. Chaos wrote songs and rehearsed in a basement for months before they played their first concert. In 1981, when their singer English Ron quit, Jack Gibson recruited Alan "Skully" Skolski. In the winter of 1982/1983, U.S. Chaos rehearsed and wrote several songs. In March 1983, they performed for the first time at a party at Aldo's Hideaway in Lyndhurst, New Jersey and many times at CBGB, as well as at City Gardens notably with T.S.O.L, in Trenton, New Jersey. In 1983 on the first American tour leg with the Exploited and Iron Cross. The lineup at this time was Skolski on vocals, Gibson on bass, Spike Glenn Mayer on drums, Gary Reitmeyer on guitar and Brian Daley (HC) on rhythm guitar.

Their first release was We've Got the Weapons, a vinyl EP released in 1983. Its production, including recording and printing by Ross Eliss, cost them $5,000, which was unheard of in the American punk scene at that time. Their second release was the single "Kill the Killers" b/w "Suicide", which cost almost as much. This was later remastered and released by manager and producer Marty Munsch, from the first pressing disk plates, and re-released by Punk Rock Records as a limited release in 1996. The unreleased singles "Blame it on Sam", "Scum Sucking Pig" and "For Being Young" were  remixed and mastered by Marty Munsch. These were eventually released. "We Are Your Enemy" and"Stopping Evolution Dead In It's Tracks" notably are near impossible to find collectors piece, with only a few dozen in existence.

Reitmeyer's departure from U.S. Chaos meant that the only original member of the band was Skolski. The band changed their name to the Chosen Few and wrote new material. This change coincided with the end of the first wave of US hardcore punk, with many bands changing their sounds or leaving the scene altogether. In 1992, U.S. Chaos reunited to perform at a party. They continued this tradition every year until 1995, when they came fully out of hiatus. Munsch, owner of Punk Rock Records, became their manager. This led to several more releases and a few movie appearances.

From 1996 to 1997, the lineup was Skolsky on vocals, Reitmeyer on guitar, Gibson on bass and Glenn 'Spikey' Mayer on drums. Mayer was later replaced by Eddie Enzyme (Active Ingredients, Fahrenheit 451, the Pickes). The band continued to play and release new material into 2007, the year Reitmeyer died. Prior to his death, Reitmeyer had recommended Buddy Vern to fill his place. Vern had recently declined a longtime membership, and was replaced by Reitmeyer's younger sister Rene Wasted, an active founding member of Blanks 77.

Munsch engineered and produced a U.S. Chaos album in 1999 called You Can't Hear A Picture, which also led to several videos and four more singles the group will be releasing more material and are currently working from The Lakehouse in Asbury Park, NJ and Cloud Factory Studios in Northern NJ

U.S. Chaos resumed their normal performance schedule as of September 15, 2007. The current lineup is Gibson on bass, Skolski on vocals, Mayer on drums and Wasted on guitar.

Discography
 "Stopping Evolution Dead In  Tracks" -  single CD, songs "For Being Young", "Panties" B/w "Stormtrooper" (Punk Rock Records, 2010), produced by Marty Munsch
 We've Got the Weapons EP (1983)
 "Eye For An Eye / Don't Wanna Live" 7" (self-released, 1984 - later reissued by Punk Rock Records/Punk-Core Records)
 U.S. CHAOS Eye For An Eye / Don't Wanna Live 7' 1984 (2022)
 Complete Chaos LP (1996)
 You Can't Hear a Picture LP (Punkrockrecords/Razorwire E.U., 1997)
 We Are Your Enemy - split 7" single with Portland, Oregon's Statch and the Rapes, remixed and mastered by Punk Rock Records, released 1999, Punk Rock Records
 Stopping Evolution Dead In It's Tracks - produced by Marty Munsch, released 2011, Punk Rock Records

Compilation appearances
 Stinkbox Records Compilation LP (1996)
 Skins N' Pins CDLP (1996)
 Punk Dwellings: New York's Finest Vol. 1 CD - songs "For Being You" and "Last Call For Alcohol" (Dwell, 1996), prod. Marty Munsch
 No More Heroes: A Tribute to the Stranglers - song "Shut Up" (Elevator Music, 1998)
 Broken Bones And Power Chords Vol. 1: New York's Finest CD - songs "For Being Young", prod. M. Munsch and "Last Call For Alcohol", Prod. M. Munsch. (Crosscheck, 2005)
 A Marty Munsch Production  EP (Punkrockrecords SG-63593, 2010, UPC: 846017048228)
 Time To Raise Some Hell EP (Punkrockrecords EMBN: 16734380 2022)

Filmography
 A Current Affair - Fox Network television show (1985), unknown clip, murder case in Washington DC area
 Pariah - movie soundtrack, U.S. Chaos 1983, 45 single, Don't wanna live (suicide), 2001, movie, soundtrack, inclusion (1996)
 Punk's Not Dead -  movie soundtrack inclusion (2006) (Susan Dyner)
 All Grown Up the Movie- documentary movie soundtrack, full inclusion, lengthy interview (2006) (Andrea Witting)
 Love and Bullets -  movie soundtrack inclusion (1999) (Matthew Brown)

Members
 1982 Gary Reitmeyer guitar, Brian "HC" Daley guitar, Jack bass, Glenn "Spikey" Mayer drums, English Ron vocals
 1982 Reitmeyer guitar, Brian "HC" Daley guitar, Jack Gibson bass, Gene drums, Allan "Skully" Skolsky vocals
 1983 Reitmeyer guitar, Brian "HC" Daley guitar, Jack Gibson bass, Glenn "Spikey" Mayer drums, Allan "Skully" Skolsky vocals
 1984 Reitmeyer guitar, Jack Gibson bass, Glenn "Spikey" Mayer drums, Allan "Skully" Skolsky vocals
 1984 Reitmeyer guitar, Brian "HC" Daley guitar, Jack Gibson bass, Glenn "Spikey" Mayer drums, Allan "Skully" Skolsky vocals
 1984-85 Steve "Hot Shot" guitar, Jack Gibson bass, Glenn "Spikey" Mayer drums, Allan "Skully" Skolsky vocals
 1985 Reitmeyer guitar, Steve "Hot Shot" guitar, Jack Gibson bass, Eddie Enzyme drums, Allan "Skully" Skolsky vocals
 1986 Reitmeyer guitar, Mark Beer guitar, Jack Gibson bass, Eddie Enzyme drums, Allan "Skully" Skolsky vocals
 1986 Reitmeyer guitar, Mark Beer guitar, Jack Gibson Bass, Jade drums, Allan "Skully" Skolsky vocals
 1987 Mark Beer guitar, Reitmeyer guitar, Tim Taylor bass, Jade drums, Allan "Skully" Skolsky vocals
 1996 - Allan "Skully" Skolsky vocals, Reitmeyer guitar, Brian H.C. Daley guitar, Jack Gibson bass, Glenn "Spikey" Mayer drums
 1997 - Allan "Skully" Skolsky vocals, Reitmeyer guitar, Jack Gibson bass, Eddie Enzyme drums
 2007 – Allan "Skully" Skolsky vocals, Rene Wasted guitar, Jack Gibson bass, Glenn "Spikey" Mayer, Eddie Enzyme drums
 2011 - Allan "Skully" Skolsky vocals, Rene Wasted guitar, Jack Gibson bass, Glenn "Spikey" Mayer drums
 2017 - Allan "Skully" Skolsky vocals, Rene Wasted guitar, Jack Gibson bass, Glenn "Spikey" Mayer drums
 2022 - Allan "Skully" Skolsky Vocals, Rene Wasted guitar,  Brian "HC" Daley guitar, Mike "HK" Guitar, Jack bass, Glenn "Spikey" Mayer drums, Eddie Enzyme drums

Management Members
 Freddy L. - manager during first incarnation
 Marty Munsch - band manager 1995–Present
 Matthew Brown - drummer for Dysfunctional Youth; filled in on drums while drummer Eddie Enzyme recovered from a work injury

References

Bibliography
 The Encyclopedia of Punk Rock (Brian Cogan), Paperback, Sterling; illustrated edition (November 9, 2008), English, . p. 347

External links 
 http://www.punkrockrecords.com Official U.S. Chaos website

Punk rock groups from New Jersey
Musical groups established in 1981
Musical groups established in 1979
Skinhead
Punk
Street punk groups
Oi! groups